Laetifomes is a fungal genus in the family Polyporaceae. It is a monotypic genus, containing the single species Laetifomes flammans.

References

Polyporaceae
Monotypic Polyporales genera
Taxa described in 2001